Death Flies East is a 1935 American mystery film directed by Phil Rosen and starring Conrad Nagel, Florence Rice and Raymond Walburn. The action takes place on an airline flight with a murderer aboard. The film was an early example of the aviation "disaster film" genre.

Plot
On a transcontinental flight from California to New York, a police detective (Fred Kelsey), found slumped in his seat is, dead, poisoned. The passengers include Evelyn Vail (Florence Rice), a nurse on parole for a murder she did not commit. The victim had also died of poisoning. The elderly doctor she worked for is still in prison. Evelyn is attempting to clear her name and bring the real killer to trial, a convict on death row at Sing Sing who can confess to the killing, if only she can get there in time.

Another passenger is John Robinson Gordon (Conrad Nagel), a college instructor who becomes involved in Evelyn's plight. He is carrying a secret armament formula to deliver to the Secretary of the Navy in Washington, D.C. He protects the valuable secret formula, clutching a briefcase at all times. John begins to suspect Evelyn but other passengers appear suspicious; who, among the other passengers, is the real murderer?

Cast 

 Conrad Nagel as John Robinson Gordon  
 Florence Rice as Evelyn Vail 
 Raymond Walburn as Evans  
 Geneva Mitchell as Helen Gilbert  
 Robert Allen as Baker  
 Oscar Apfel as Wallace P. Burroughs  
 Miki Morita as Satu
 Purnell Pratt as Dr. Landers  
 Irene Franklin as Mrs. Laura Madison  
 George Irving as Dr. Jim Moffat  
 Adrian Rosley as Pastoli  
 Fred Kelsey as Police Lieutenant O'Brien  
 George "Gabby" Hayes as Wotkyns

Production
Principal photography on Death Flies East took place from December 27, 1934 to January 15, 1935. Interiors and flight-deck scenes, however, were shot in a studio using a mock-up.

Reception
Aviation historian Michael Paris equated Death Flies East as a progenitor of the "disaster film". He wrote, "... the stereotyped collection of passengers, essential in the disaster movie, were first created in the 1930s in films such as Thirteen Hours by Air and Death Flies East.

References

Notes

Citations

Bibliography

 Beck, Simon D. The Aircraft-Spotter's Film and Television Companion. Jefferson, North Carolina: McFarland & Company, 2016. .
 Paris, Michael. From the Wright Brothers to Top Gun: Aviation, Nationalism, and Popular Cinema. Manchester, UK: Manchester University Press, 1995. .
 Parish, James Robert. Hollywood Character Actors. New Rochelle, New York: Arlington House, 1978. .
 Pendo, Stephen. Aviation in the Cinema. Lanham, Maryland: Scarecrow Press, 1985. .

External links
 
 

1935 films
1935 mystery films
American aviation films
American mystery films
Films directed by Phil Rosen
Columbia Pictures films
American black-and-white films
1930s English-language films
1930s American films